Yuzuki Yamamoto (born 1 September 2002) is a Japanese professional footballer who plays as a forward for WE League club Tokyo Verdy Beleza.

Club career 
Yamamoto made her WE League debut on 18 September 2021.

References 

Living people
2002 births
Women's association football forwards
WE League players
Japanese women's footballers
Association football people from Gifu Prefecture
Nippon TV Tokyo Verdy Beleza players